Buy Me Once is an online shopping website offering sustainable and durable consumer goods. The website was founded in 2016 by Tara Button, once an ad executive, after she received a Le Creuset cooking pot and was impressed by its durability and design. The aim of the site is to encourage people to "Love Things That Last"  and to change human behaviour from short-term throwaway buying to longer term, mindful buying.

The original website incorporates US and UK domains and stocks now more than 2,000 products. Buy Me Once also did a raise through Crowdcube of £550k in 2019 with an investment from the Green Angel Syndicate, a network of smart investors who are committed to the transition to a greener economy.

In 2018 HarperCollins published A Life Less Throwaway, a book by Button promoting the idea of "mindful curation" and her website. This book was also published in the US in June 2018 by Penguin Random House. More recently, the founder and CEO Tara Button was featured in the last ever print issue of Marie Claire as one of their "Future Shapers".

References

Online retailers of the United Kingdom